This is a list of articles related to plate tectonics and tectonic plates.

What is plate tectonics?

General concepts

Tectonic plate interactions

Back arc basins

Continents

Paleocontinents

 
 
 
 
 
 
 
  (Also known as Sahul)

Earthquakes

Oceans

Ancient oceans

Superoceans

Orogenies

Rifts

Active rifts

Continental rifts

Oceanic ridges
 
 
 
 
 
 
 
 
 
 (Mid-Arctic Ridge)
 
 
 
 
 
 
 
 Kolbeinsey Ridge (North of Iceland)
 Mohns Ridge
  Ridge (between Greenland and Spitsbergen)
  (South of Iceland)

Aulacogens

Subduction zones

Suture zones

Tectonic plates

Terranes

Triple junctions

Other plate tectonics topics

Specific areas
(to be reallocated)
 
 
 
 
 
 
 
 
 
 
 
 
 
 

Plate tectonics

plate tectonics